Orri Steinn Óskarsson (born 29 August 2004) is an Icelandic professional footballer who plays for Sønderjyske, on loan from Copenhagen.

Club career 
Orri Óskarsson came through the academy of Grótta, in his native Iceland. He made his senior debut with the club on 18 August 2018, aged 13 years and 354 days, when he came on as a substitute in the 2018 2. deild match against Höttur, scoring two goals on his debut in a 5–0 victory. In total he played 3 games and scored 3 goals in his first season as the club were promoted from the third tier under the management of his father, Óskar Hrafn Þorvaldsson. He played 12 games out of 22 and scored 1 goal in the following season in the second tier, as Grótta were promoted again, this time to the top tier. After the season it was announced that Orri would be joining the Danish club of FC Copenhagen in the summer of 2020.

He made his professional debut for Copenhagen on the 22 May 2022, during the last game of that season—a 3–0 home league win against Aalborg BK, only few days before he signed a contract extension with the Danish champions.

On 31 January 2023, he joined Danish 1st Division side Sønderjyske on loan for the rest of the season.

Club

Personal life
His father is former international footballer and current manager of Breiðablik, Óskar Hrafn Þorvaldsson. His father managed him while he played with Grótta in both the youth teams and the first team.

Honours
Grótta
 1. deild: 2019
Copenhagen
 Danish Superliga: 2021–22

References

External links

2004 births
Living people
Icelandic footballers
Icelandic expatriate footballers
Association football midfielders
Iceland youth international footballers
Danish Superliga players
1. deild karla players
Grótta men's football players
F.C. Copenhagen players
SønderjyskE Fodbold players
Icelandic expatriate sportspeople in Denmark
Expatriate footballers in Denmark